The 2021 James Madison Dukes football team represented James Madison University as a member of the Colonial Athletic Association (CAA) during the 2021 NCAA Division I FCS football season. They were led by third-year head coach Curt Cignetti and played their home games at Bridgeforth Stadium.

On November 6, 2021, James Madison announced that this will be the last season for the team in the CAA and join the Sun Belt Conference (FBS) on July 1, 2022.

Previous season

The Dukes finished the regular season as champions of the CAA South Division, and earned an at-large bid to the FCS Playoffs. James Madison lost in the national semifinals at eventual national champion, Sam Houston State.

Schedule

References

James Madison
James Madison Dukes football seasons
Colonial Athletic Association football champion seasons
2021 NCAA Division I FCS playoff participants
James Madison Dukes football